Michael Pucillo (born July 14, 1979) is a former American football player who played offensive guard in the National Football League.

Pucillo attended Auburn University and was a letterman in football. In football, he played offensive guard and center, started 25 games, and as a junior, he helped the team average 356.7 total yards per game. He was drafted in the seventh round of the 2002 NFL Draft.

On February 27, 2007, Pucillo re-signed with the Redskins in a 1-year contract worth $540,000 (veteran minimum).

Due to an injury to Todd Wade, Pucillo got his first start at left guard during the preseason against the Pittsburgh Steelers. Head Coach Joe Gibbs said, "With Todd being hurt, we gave him a chance to start and I thought he did very well. He continues to be a valuable guy because he can do so many things for you. He can play tight end for you in our [short yardage] package. He can back up Casey at center and now he has a chance to start at guard. So we have to continue to play that out. There's an example of someone seizing an opportunity and he gave it everything he's got. He has been impressive."  However, the Redskins did not resign Pucillo after the 2007 season so he became a free agent.

References

American football offensive guards
Auburn Tigers football players
Buffalo Bills players
Cleveland Browns players
Players of American football from Cleveland
Washington Redskins players
1979 births
Living people